Cymindis oxiana is a species of ground beetle in the subfamily Harpalinae. It was described by Kabak in 1997.

References

oxiana
Beetles described in 1997